Avramiou is a village in Messenia, southern Greece. It was built before 1816; it had 32 families then.  During the Turkish occupation, it was a village of Koroni province, and became a village of Messini province and capital of Leukothea Municipality ( now defunct) in 1835. In August 1840, Avramiou became a village of Aristomenis Municipality; it was almost destroyed by earthquakes in 1846. The primary school of Avramiou was founded in 1860. Ten years after, Avramiou became the capital of Aristomeni Municipality. Today, it is a community of the municipality Messini. The community contains the villages Drakoneri, Agios Avgoustinos and Avramiou. In 2011, the population for Avramiou village was 334, and 466 for the community.

Location 

Avramiou is 10 km from Messini and 5.5 km from the beach. Some villages near Avramiou are: Lefkochora, Lykotrafos, Madena, Neochori, and Strefi.

Population

References 

1. History of Avramiou (Messini) Alexandros Giannakopoulos, Athens 1984

Populated places in Messenia